Rulelog is an expressive  semantic rule-based knowledge representation and reasoning (KRR) language. It underlies knowledge representation languages used in systems such as Flora-2, SILK and others. It extends well-founded declarative logic programs with features for higher-order syntax, frame syntax, defeasibility, general quantified expressions both in the bodies of the rules and their heads, user-defined functions, and restraint bounded rationality.

Features
Rulelog extends well-founded semantics for declarative logic rules with features for higher-order syntax (HiLog), frame syntax (cf. F-Logic), defeasibility (prioritized defaults), general formulas (including existentials and disjunctions in rule heads), user-defined functions, and restraint bounded rationality.  Overall, Rulelog combines deep logical/probabilistic reasoning with natural language processing (NLP), and complements machine learning (ML). Rulelog interoperates and composes well with graph databases, relational databases, spreadsheets, XML, RDF/OWL, and can orchestrate overall hybrid KRR.  Despite its expressibility, Rulelog is computationally affordable (inferencing is worst-case polynomial time when radial restraint is employed). The more capable and efficient implementations of Rulelog, such as Ergo, Flora-2, and Ontobroker leverage methods from Logic programming, Non-monotonic reasoning, Business rules, the Semantic Web, and Databases. Rulelog implementation methods (in systems like Ergo, Flora-2 and some others) include dependency-aware smart caching of reasoning results (memoization, also known as tabling  in logic programming), indexing, and goal reordering (for improving the performance of joins).

History
Rulelog builds on decades of work in Logic Programming and Deductive database research; it combines several different extensions of declarative logic programs whose language and implementations were originally developed by a number of different researchers since 1990's. Many of Rulelog's features derive from earlier systems, including Flora-2, SweetRules, XSB, SWSL, and others.

Standardization Efforts
There was a number of standardization efforts for precursors of Rulelog:

 Semantic Web Services Language was submitted as a member submission to W3C in April, 2005.
 RIF Framework for Logic Dialects (RIF-FLD) is a W3C recommendation, which is intended as a means for formal specification of Web logic languages such as Rulelog. 
 Rulelog: Syntax and Semantics. A version of the Rulelog specification using the RIF-FLD framework is standardized by RuleML. The source files for that specification are found here.

Systems Implementing Rulelog
 Flora-2: an open source rule-based system for knowledge representation and reasoning.
 ErgoAI: a commercial implementation of Rulelog by Coherent Knowledge, which includes an IDE and many extensions.
 Sunflower: an integrated development environment for Flora-2.
 SILK: a precursor to Ergo.
 Ontobroker: a commercial implementation of a subset of Rulelog, which is largely based on F-logic with various extensions.
 XSB: supports a smaller subset of Rulelog's features, but a number of other systems, like Flora-2 and Ergo, are based on XSB. Open source.

See also
 RuleML
Flora-2
Ontology (computer science)
 Semantic Web Rule Language

References 

Knowledge representation software
Declarative programming languages